John Kraft may refer to:

Jack Kraft (John J. Kraft, 1921–2014), basketball coach
John Kraft (academic), current dean of the Warrington College of Business Administration at the University of Florida